The 1929–30 FA Cup was the 55th season of the world's oldest football cup competition, the Football Association Challenge Cup, commonly known as the FA Cup. Arsenal won the competition for the first time, beating Huddersfield Town 2–0 in the final at Wembley.

Matches were scheduled to be played at the stadium of the team named first on the date specified for each round, which was always a Saturday. Some matches, however, might be rescheduled for other days if there were clashes with games for other competitions or the weather was inclement. If scores were level after 90 minutes had been played, a replay would take place at the stadium of the second-named team later the same week. If the replayed match was drawn further replays would be held until a winner was determined. If scores were level after 90 minutes had been played in a replay, a 30-minute period of extra time would be played.

Calendar

First round proper
At this stage 41 clubs from the Football League Third Division North and South joined 24 non-league clubs and Third Division North side York City, who came through the qualifying rounds. Crystal Palace and Swindon Town were given a bye to the Third Round. To make the number of matches up, non-league Mansfield Town and Ilford were given byes to this round. 34 matches were scheduled to be played on Saturday, 30 November 1929. Seven were drawn and went to replays in the following midweek fixture, of which two went to a second replay.

Second round proper
The matches were played on Saturday, 14 December 1929. Three matches were drawn, with replays taking place in the following midweek fixture.

Third round proper
The 44 First and Second Division clubs, entered the competition at this stage, along with Third Division Crystal Palace and Swindon Town. Also given a bye to this round of the draw were amateur side Corinthian. The matches were scheduled for Saturday, 11 January 1930. Eight matches were drawn and went to replays in the following midweek fixture, of which one went to a second replay.

Fourth round proper
The matches were scheduled for Saturday, 25 January 1930. Five games were drawn and went to replays in the following midweek fixture, of which one went to a second replay.

Fifth round proper
The matches were scheduled for Saturday, 15 February 1930. There was one replay, between Sunderland and Nottingham Forest, played in the next midweek fixture.

Sixth round proper
The four Sixth Round ties were scheduled to be played on Saturday, 1 March 1930. There were two replays.

Semi-finals
The semi-final matches were played on Saturday, 22 March 1930. Arsenal and Hull City drew, replaying their game four days later. Huddersfield Town and Arsenal won their matches to meet in the final at Wembley.

Replay

Final

The 1930 FA Cup Final was contested by Arsenal and Huddersfield Town at Wembley. Arsenal won 2–0, with goals from Alex James and Jack Lambert.

Match details

See also
FA Cup Final Results 1872-

References
General
Official site; fixtures and results service at TheFA.com
1929-30 FA Cup at rssf.com
1929-30 FA Cup at soccerbase.com

Specific

FA Cup seasons
FA
Cup